The 1988–89 season was Maccabi Haifa's 31st season in the Liga Leumit, and their 8th consecutive season in the top division of Israeli football.

The season was a great success for the club winning the league and coming extremely close to winning the State Cup to go with it.

First Division

State Cup

Toto Cup

Squad statistics

Maccabi Haifa F.C. seasons
Maccabi Haifa